Union Star is an unincorporated community within Breckinridge County, Kentucky, United States.

Union Star was incorporated in 1868.

References

Unincorporated communities in Breckinridge County, Kentucky
Unincorporated communities in Kentucky